Verdello is a comune in the province of Bergamo, Lombardy, Italy. It has a population of 6,494.

Twin towns — sister cities
Verdello is twinned with:

  Balaruc-les-Bains, France

Transportation
 Verdello-Dalmine railway station

Cities and towns in Lombardy